Laos competed at the 2004 Summer Olympics in Athens, Greece, from 13 to 29 August 2004. This was the nation's sixth appearance at the Olympics, having attended every edition of the Olympiad since 1980 except the 1984 Summer Olympics in Los Angeles, because of the Soviet boycott.

Five Laotian athletes were selected to the team by wild card entries in archery, athletics, and swimming, without having qualified. Sprinter Chamleunesouk Ao Oudomphonh was the nation's flag bearer at the opening ceremony. 

Laos has yet to win its first Olympic medal.

Archery

One Laotian archer qualified for the men's individual archery through a tripartite invitation.

Athletics

Laotian athletes have so far achieved qualifying standards in the following athletics events (up to a maximum of 3 athletes in each event at the 'A' Standard, and 1 at the 'B' Standard).

Men

Women

Swimming

Men

Women

See also
 Laos at the 2002 Asian Games

References

External links
Official Report of the XXVIII Olympiad

Nations at the 2004 Summer Olympics
2004
2004 in Laotian sport